The 1911 Oklahoma Sooners football team represented the University of Oklahoma as an independent during the 1911 college football season. In their seventh year under head coach Bennie Owen, the Sooners compiled an 8–0 record, and outscored their opponents by a combined total of 282 to 15.

Schedule

References

Oklahoma
Oklahoma Sooners football seasons
College football undefeated seasons
Oklahoma Sooners football